The Ministry of Commerce; abbreviated as MoCom), is a Cabinet-level ministry of the Government of Pakistan concerned with economic growth and commerce development and promotion in Pakistan.  The administrative head of the ministry is the Commerce Secretary of Pakistan. The political head, Minister of Commerce, is required to be the member of Parliament.

Departments

State Life Insurance Corporation 
 
State Life Insurance Corporation of Pakistan in the state owned life insurance company. It was formed in 1972 when life insurance business in Pakistan was nationalized and 32 life insurance companies were merged and consolidated.

Trading Corporation of Pakistan 

Trading Corporation of Pakistan (TCP) is the principal trading arm of the Government of Pakistan. Established as an international trading house in 1967, the Corporation has gradually moved from barter, through commodity exchange to cash trade. TCP undertakes import of essential commodities to help ensure their availability to the common man at affordable prices.

Trade Development Authority

The Trade Development Authority of Pakistan (TDAP) was established in 2006. TDAP is the successor organization to the Export Promotion Bureau (EPB) and is mandated to have a holistic view of global trade development rather than only the ‘export promotion’ perspective of its predecessor. It is designated as the premier trade organization of the country.

National Tariff Commission 
The National Tariff Commission (abbreviated at NTC) advises the Government of Pakistan on tariff measures or other form of assistance to provide protection to indigenous industry and promoting exports. Measures to counter dumping and other unfair measures adopted in respect of import and sale of foreign goods in Pakistan.

Pakistan Institute of Trade and Development 
Pakistan Institute of Trade and Development, formerly Foreign Trade Institute of Pakistan (FTIP) was  created in 1989 to provide specialized trainings to officers of Commerce and Trade Group.

In 2009 the institute was restructured and it now acts as policy Think Tank also and training center on International trade.

Pakistan Tobacco Board

Pakistan Tobacco Board (PTB) is a statutory semi-autonomous department of Government of Pakistan under Ministry of Commerce. Pakistan Tobacco Board oversees the promotion of the cultivation, manufacture and export of tobacco and tobacco products in Pakistan.

Pakistan Reinsurance Company 
Pakistan Reinsurance Company Limited (PRCL) is a public sector company under the administrative control of the Ministry of Commerce is the sole reinsurance organization operating in Pakistan..Formerly called the Pakistan Insurance Corporation, Pakistan Reinsurance Company Limited was established in 1952.

PRCL's Role in Economic Development
The role of PRCL in economic development of Pakistan is significant. PRCL awareness of increasing requirements of insurance and reinsurance of a progressive economy is making great efforts in coming up to national expectations. This progress signifies the consolidation of the position, both at home and abroad, encouraging further expansion.

International Cooperation/ Business Relations
PRCL is actively collaborating and participating with its international counterparts in the field of insurance and reinsurance. This is being achieved  under the aegis of Economic Cooperation Organization (ECO) with the object of reducing the outflow of Foreign Exchange and improving the standard of insurance and reinsurance services in the region. PRCL has been one of the pioneers and founder members of the Federation of Afro-Asian Insurers and Reinsurers (FAIR).

National Insurance Company Limited 
National Insurance Company Limited (NICL) was established in 1976 to provide insurance cover to the Government/Semi Government organizations.
National Insurance Company Limited is 100% owned by Government of Pakistan  and working under the administrative control of federal ministry of commerce.

Pakistan Horticulture Development and Export Company

Pakistan Horticulture Development & Export Board (PHDEC), an autonomous body under the administrative control of the Ministry of Commerce has been mandated with the development of the horticulture industry of Pakistan with a focus on exports. Its functions include the provision of improved marketing infrastructure like the establishment of agro-processing zones, cold chain system, processing plants for value-added products. The implementation arrangements are preferably under the public-private partnership (PPP) modality with a clear exit strategy. PHDEC envisions the vitalization of a dynamic and market-driven horticulture sector, which is resilient, sustainable and responsive to meet the challenges of globalization

Directorate General of Trade Organizations
Directorate General of Trade Organisations is working as an attached department of Ministry of Commerce. It was established in 2007.  
The core function of this Directorate is to process the applications for grant of licenses and registration of trade bodies.  It also oversees the elections and results of Office Bearers and Executive Committee members of trade bodies and ensures that Trade Organizations Act and Rules made there-under are being followed.

Pakistan Institute of Fashion and Design

The Pakistan Institute of Fashion and Design, commonly referred to as PIFD, (formerly known as Pakistan School of Fashion Design) is a design institute specialising in design education. It offers a four-year course of study leading to a bachelor's degree.

List of Commerce Ministers of Pakistan

See also 
 Economy of Pakistan
 Ministry of Finance (Pakistan)
 Pakistan Board of Investment
 Trading Corporation of Pakistan
 Pakistan Horticulture Development and Export Board

References

External links
 Ministry of Commerce
 Board of Investment
 Trade Development Authority of Pakistan
 Trading Corporation of Pakistan
 National Tariff Commission
 State Life Insurance Corporation
 Pakistan Tobacco Board
 Pakistan Institute of Trade and Development
 National Insurance Company Limited
 Pakistan Institute of Fashion and Design
 Directorate General of Trade Organisations
 Pakistan Horticulture Development and Export Company 
 Textile Division

1973 establishments in Pakistan
Commerce
Pakistan
Textile industry of Pakistan